Ferrous lactate, or iron(II) lactate, is chemical compound with idealized formula (H2O)n.  No compound has been characterized to establish composition, purity, or structure.

Production
Iron(II) lactate can be produced through several reactions, among which are calcium lactate with iron(II) sulfate according to the following reaction:
Ca(C3H5O3)2(aq) + FeSO4(aq)->CaSO4v + Fe(C3H5O3)2(aq)

Another route yielding iron(II) lactate is to combine lactic acid with calcium carbonate and iron(II) sulfate.

Uses
Iron (II) lactate is used as a reagent in the production of proton-exchange membrane fuel cells (PEMFCs), specifically in the production of cathode catalytic converters used in these cells. It is an acidity regulator and, since it oxidizes on contact with air, it has found use as a color retention agent for foodstuffs such as olives. It is also used to fortify foods with iron, as a remedy for anemia due to iron deficiency, and as a nutritional supplement in tablet or pill form. As a food additive it is coded under the E number E585.

References

Food additives
Iron(II) compounds
E-number additives
Lactates